The Yele Dam is an embankment dam on the Nanya River along the border of Mianning County and Shimian County, Sichuan Province, China. Because the dam lies within a Level VIII earthquake intensity zone, its core is composed of asphalt concrete. Construction on the dam began in 2000, the reservoir began impounding on January 1, 2005 and the entire project was complete in August 2006. The purpose of the dam is to produce hydroelectricity and it supports a 240 MW power station.

See also 

 List of power stations in China

References

Hydroelectric power stations in Sichuan
Dams in China
Rock-filled dams
Dams completed in 2006